Christine Jönsson, born in 1958, is a Swedish politician of the Moderate Party. She has been a member of the Riksdag since 2006.

References

Christine Jönsson at the Riksdag website

Members of the Riksdag from the Moderate Party
Living people
1958 births
Women members of the Riksdag
21st-century Swedish women politicians